Alexander Hendrik George Rinnooy Kan (born 5 October 1949) is a Dutch politician, businessman and mathematician who served as Chairman of the Social and Economic Council from 2006 to 2012. A member of the Democrats 66 (D66) party, he was a member of the Senate from 2015 to 2019 and is a distinguished professor of Economics and Business Studies at the University of Amsterdam since 1 September 2012. He has also been president of the supervisory board of EYE Film Institute Netherlands since 2008 and of Museum Boerhaave since 2018.

Biography

Early life and education 
Rinnooy Kan grew up in The Hague. He graduated with a doctorandus degree (eq. to MSc) in mathematics at Leiden University in 1972. The same year, he also obtained a candidate degree (eq. to BSc) in econometrics from the University of Amsterdam. In 1972–1973, he worked as a mathematician at Spectrum Encyclopedia. From 1973 until 1977, he was a scientific employee in the Department of Mathematics and Statistics at Delft University of Technology (then called the Delft Technical College). In 1976, he obtained a PhD in mathematics at the University of Amsterdam; he was advised by Gijsbert de Leve.

Private career 
In 1977, he went to the Erasmus University Rotterdam, where he became a full Professor in Operations Research in 1980 at the age of 30. In 1983, he was appointed head of the Econometric Institute and in 1986 rector magnificus of the university. In the meantime, he was visiting professor at the University of California, Berkeley and MIT, among others.

From 1991 until 1996, he was president of the employers federation VNO and (after the merger with NCW) of the VNO-NCW. Between 1996 and 2006, Rinnooy Kan was a member of the board of directors of ING Group, where he was responsible for the Asian branch. He was a member of the Netherlands Innovation Platform until the platform was dissolved in 2010.

Social Economic Council 
From 2006 until 2012, he was a crown-appointed member and Chairman of the Social and Economic Council (SER). He was succeeded in this position by Wiebe Draijer. During his farewell party at the SER he was appointed Commander in the Order of the Netherlands Lion. The Dutch newspaper de Volkskrant named him the most influential person in the Netherlands in 2007, 2008 and 2009.

Senate 
On 9 June 2015, he became a member of the Senate on behalf of the Democrats 66 party. He did not seek reelection to the upper chamber in 2019; his term ended on 11 June 2019.

Publications

Books 
 1985 The Traveling Salesman Problem: A Guided Tour of Combinatorial Optimization. With Eugene L. Lawler, Jan Karel Lenstra, and David B. Shmoys. John Wiley & Sons, New York, NY.
 1993, Logistics of Production and Inventory. Vol. 4. with Stephen C. Graves, and Paul Herbert Zipkin, eds.

Selected articles 
 Byrd, R. H., Dert, C. L., Rinnooy Kan, A. H. G., & Schnabel, R. B. (1990). "Concurrent Stochastic Methods for Global Optimization". Mathematical Programming, 46(1-3), 1-29.
 Lenstra, A. K., A. H. G. Rinnooy Kan, and Alexander Schrijver. "History of Mathematical Programming: A Collection of Personal Reminiscences." (1991).
 Bastian, Cock, and Alexander H. G. Rinnooy Kan. "The Stochastic Vehicle Routing Problem Revisited." European Journal of Operational Research 56.3 (1992): 407–412.
 Flippo, O. E., & Rinnooy Kan, A. H. G. (1993). "Decomposition in General Mathematical Programming". Mathematical Programming, 60(1-3), 361–382.
 Lawler, Eugene L., J. K. Lenstra, A. H. G. Rinnooy Kan, and D.B. Shmoys . "Sequencing and Scheduling: Algorithms and Complexity." Handbooks in Operations Research and Management Science 4 (1993): 445–522.

Decorations

References

External links

Official
  Prof.Dr. A.H.G. (Alexander) Rinnooy Kan Parlement & Politiek
  Prof.Dr. A.H.G. Rinnooy Kan (D66) Eerste Kamer der Staten-Generaal

 
 

 

 

 

 

1949 births
Living people
Business educators
Chairmen of the Social and Economic Council
Commanders of the Order of the Netherlands Lion
Honorary Knights Commander of the Order of the British Empire
Academic staff of the Delft University of Technology
Democrats 66 politicians
Dutch academic administrators
Dutch business theorists
Dutch business writers
Dutch corporate directors
Dutch financial writers
Dutch nonprofit executives
Dutch nonprofit directors
Dutch trade association executives
Dutch political writers
Dutch technology writers
Academic staff of Erasmus University Rotterdam
Leiden University alumni
Academic staff of Leiden University
Mathematical economists
Mathematics writers
Members of the Senate (Netherlands)
Members of the Social and Economic Council
People from Bloemendaal
Politicians from The Hague
Rectors of universities in the Netherlands
University of Amsterdam alumni
Academic staff of the University of Amsterdam
20th-century Dutch businesspeople
20th-century Dutch civil servants
20th-century Dutch economists
20th-century Dutch educators
20th-century Dutch male writers
20th-century Dutch mathematicians
20th-century Dutch politicians
21st-century Dutch businesspeople
21st-century Dutch civil servants
21st-century Dutch economists
21st-century Dutch educators
21st-century Dutch male writers
21st-century Dutch mathematicians
21st-century Dutch politicians